The 1989 Prince Edward Island general election was held on May 29, 1989.

The campaign resulted in the re-election of the Liberal government of Premier Joe Ghiz. In this election, the Liberals won 60.7% of the popular vote, the highest percentage that a winning party has taken on record in Prince Edward Island. The Progressive Conservatives won 2 seats despite taking 36 percent of the popular vote; they were due 12 seats. This was the lowest share of the vote that the Progressive Conservatives ever received, 35.8%. Only 5 times has the Opposition had 2 or fewer seats in the history of Prince Edward Island; this was one of them.

One of the two members from each constituency is styled a Councillor, and the other an Assemblyman. In electoral contests Councillor candidates run against Councillor candidates; Assemblyman candidates against Assemblyman candidates.

Party standings

Members elected

The Legislature of Prince Edward Island had two levels of membership from 1893 to 1996 - Assemblymen and Councillors. This was a holdover from when the Island had a bicameral legislature, the General Assembly and the Legislative Council.

In 1893, the Legislative Council was abolished and had its membership merged with the Assembly, though the two titles remained separate and were elected by different electoral franchises. Assembleymen were elected by all eligible voters of within a district. Before 1963, Councillors were only elected by landowners within a district, but afterward they were elected in the same manner as Assemblymen.

Kings

Prince

Queens

Sources

Further reading
 

1989 elections in Canada
Elections in Prince Edward Island
1989 in Prince Edward Island
May 1989 events in Canada